Mars is a planet in the Solar System.

Mars also commonly refers to:
Mars (mythology), the Ancient Roman god of war, equivalent to the Greek god Ares
Mars, Incorporated, a confectioner and food company
Mars (chocolate bar), produced by Mars, Inc.

Mars may also refer to:

Biology and medicine
MARS (gene), a human enzyme
Medication Administration Record Sheet
MARS, the Molecular Adsorbents Recirculation System for liver dialysis

Geography
Mars Glacier, Alexander Island, Antarctica

Canada
MaRS Discovery District, a scientific research centre in Toronto
McGill Arctic Research Station, Nunavut, Canada

France
Mars, Ardèche, France
Mars-sous-Bourcq, Ardennes, France
Mars, Gard, France
Mars, Loire, France
Mars-la-Tour, Meurthe-et-Moselle, France
Mars-sur-Allier, Nièvre, France

United States
Monterey Accelerated Research System, a cabled-based ocean observatory in Monterey Bay, California
Mars, California, a populated place
Mars Bluff, South Carolina, an unincorporated community
Outingdale, California, formerly called Mars, a populated place
Le Mars, Iowa, a city in and the county seat of Plymouth County
Mars, Nebraska, a ghost town
Mars, Pennsylvania, a borough
Mars, Texas, a ghost town

Ukraine
Mars, Chernihiv Oblast, a village on North of Ukraine

Media, music and arts

Fictional entities
Mars (Black Clover), a character in Black Clover
Mars (Biker Mice from Mars), the planet as it appears in Biker Mice from Mars
Military Armament Research Syndicate, a fictional organization in the G.I. Joe universe
Commander Mars, a Pokémon character
Mars or Scarface, an Ultimate Muscle character
The Megaversity Association for Reenactments and Simulations, a fictional association in The Big U
Mars the Dog, canine star of A Dog's Breakfast

Film and television
Mars (1930 film), an animated short film in the Oswald the Lucky Rabbit series
Mars (1968 film), a soviet science education/fiction film
Mars (1997 film), a film starring Shari Belafonte
Mars (1998 film), a film starring Olivier Gruner
Mars (2004 film), a Russian film set in Mars, a small town on the Black Sea
Mars (2010 film), a 2010 animated film
Mars (American TV series), a 2016 docudrama science fiction series
Mars (Taiwanese TV series), a 2004 drama series based on the manga by Fuyumi Soryo
Mars (talk show), a female talk show on GMA News TV
Mars, an upcoming animated film by The Whitest Kids U' Know

Literature
Mars (Fritz Zorn), a 1976 autobiographical essay by Fritz Angst
Mars (comics), a comic book series
Mars (manga), a 1996 manga series by Fuyumi Soryo
Mars trilogy, three science fiction novels by Kim Stanley Robinson
Mars, a novel by Ben Bova in the Grand Tour series
Mars, 1976 manga series by Mitsuteru Yokoyama
The Mars Project, a non-fiction science book by Wernher von Braun
Project Mars: A Technical Tale, a science fiction novel by Wernher von Braun

Music albums
Mars (B'z album)
Mars (Gackt album)
Mars, disk two of the Red Hot Chili Peppers double album Stadium Arcadium
Mars, an album by Sinkane

Music groups
Mars Music, a now defunct U.S. music store chain
Mars (band), a No Wave band
M.A.R.S., a heavy metal supergroup that released the 1986 album Project Driver
MARRS, British electronic music group

Songs and movements
"Mars" (song), a 2008 single by Fake Blood
"Mars, the Bringer of War", a movement in Holst's The Planets
"Mars", a song by Jay Sean from Neon
"Mars", a song by Mario from Closer to Mars
"Mars", a song by Soulfly from Prophecy

Video gaming
Project Mars, codename for the Sega 32X add-on video game console
Memory Array Redcode Simulator, the environment for the competitive programming game Core War

Military
MARS (missile), air to ground missile built by Israel Military Industries
Mars Automatic Pistol, a semi-automatic pistol developed in 1900
MARS tanker, a programme to buy new tanker ships for the Royal Fleet Auxiliary
ITL MARS, a reflex sight made by International Technologies Lasers
Operation Mars, codename of the Second Rzhev-Sychevka Offensive, a Soviet offensive during World War II
Military Auxiliary Radio System, an auxiliary communications system of amateur radio operators for the United States armed forces
 or M270 Multiple Launch Rocket System
Operation Mars, 28 March 1918 German offensive in World War I, part of the Spring Offensive

Warships
Dutch frigate Mars, later HMS Mars, a 32-gun fifth rate ship of the line built in 1769
French ship Mars, a list of French warships
French privateer Mars (1746), later HMS Mars, a 64-gun third-rate 
HMS Mars, a list of ships of the Royal Navy
HMS Mars (1759), a 74-gun third rate
HMS Mars (1794), a 74-gun third rate
Mars-class ship of the line
HMS Mars (1848), an 80-gun second rate
HMS Mars (1896), a Majestic-class battleship
HMS Mars (R76), a Colossus-class aircraft carrier renamed HMS Pioneer in 1944
Mars, a planned Minotaur-class cruiser of the Royal Navy, cancelled in 1946
SMS Mars, a list of ships
SMS Mars (1879), a German gunnery training ship
SMS Tegetthoff (1878) or SMS Mars, an Austro-Hungarian central battery ship
Swedish warship Mars, a ship sunk in 1564
USS Mars, several ships of the US Navy
USS Mars (1798), a galley
USS Mars (AC-6), launched in 1909
USS Mars (AFS-1), launched in 1963
Mars-class combat stores ship

Mars class, several ship classes

Organizations and products
Mars (beer), a type of lambic ale
Mars (motorcycle), a defunct German motorcycle manufacturer
Mars (oil platform), an oil drilling platform in the Gulf of Mexico
Mars (supermarket), a U.S. grocery chain
Icaro Mars, an Italian hang glider design
MARS Group, a British architectural think tank founded in 1933
Mauritius Amateur Radio Society
Mongolian Amateur Radio Society
Mumbai Amateur Radio Society, Mumbai, India
Mars Tver, a former name of THK Tver, a minor professional ice hockey club in Tver, Russia

People
Mars (surname), a list of people with the surname
Cheung Wing-fat (born 1954), nicknamed Mars, Hong Kong actor, action director, stuntman and martial artist
Mars (rapper) (born 1980), stage name of Mario Delgado, American horrorcore rapper
Mars (record producer), moniker of Lamar Edwards from production teams 1500 or Nothin' and Smash Factory
Jean-Baptiste Belley or Mars (1740s–1805), Senegalese Haitian politician
Xueyang "Mars" Ma, member of Mandopop boy band Top Combine

People with the given name
Mars Argo, stage name of Brittany Sheets, American singer, songwriter, actress, photographer, Internet personality and YouTuber
Mars Bonfire (born 1943), Canadian musician and songwriter
Mars Di Bartolomeo (born 1952), Luxembourgish politician
Mars Ravelo (1916–1988), Filipino comic book cartoonist and graphic novelist

Technology
MARS (cipher), a block cipher, IBM's submission for the AES
Cisco Security Monitoring, Analysis, and Response System, a security monitoring tool for network devices
Mars computer, a family of PDP-10-compatible digital computers built by Systems Concepts
Mars program, a series of unmanned spacecraft launched by the Soviet Union
Mid-Atlantic Regional Spaceport, a space launch site on Wallops Island, Virginia
Mars Analogue Research Station Program, of The Mars Society
Marketing and Reporting Sales system, a customer relationship management software package produced and sold by Phoenix American

Transportation
Mars Light, an oscillating railroad safety light found on locomotives
MARS (ticket reservation system), a train seat reservation system used in Japan
Mars (Metra), a station on Metra's Milwaukee District/West in Chicago, Illinois
JRM Mars, a flying boat
Mars, a West Cornwall Railway locomotive

Other uses
Mars (astrology), a set of qualities and influences
Mars (surname)
Mars family, the family that owns Mars, Incorporated
Multivariate adaptive regression splines, a statistical analysis technique

See also

Ares (disambiguation)
Colonization of Mars for the Mars colony concept
Exploration of Mars, for various Mars projects and programmes
Champ de Mars (disambiguation)
Field of Mars (disambiguation)
Mars 1 (disambiguation)
Mars II (disambiguation)
Mars Hill (disambiguation)
Mars station (disambiguation)
Marrs, an American surname